Muhammad Ali (born 20 June 1996) is a British professional boxer. As an amateur, he competed at the 2016 Summer Olympics, 2015 World Championships and the 2014 Youth World Championships where he won a silver medal.

Amateur career
Ali won the 2015 Amateur Boxing Association British flyweight title, when boxing out of the Bury ABC.

Failed drug test
In February 2018, Ali was banned from boxing for two years after traces of the anabolic steroid, Trenbolone were found in a urine sample whilst he was competing for the British Lionhearts in Casablanca, Morocco. Ali denied any wrongdoing, however his ban was upheld after he failed to provide enough evidence that he wasn’t at fault.

Professional career
On 22 February 2020, Ali made his professional debut against the experienced Bulgarian Stefan Sashev. Ali won the bout after referee, Lee Every, disqualified Sashev for persistent holding. Ali's second bout as a professional was against Jamie Quinn on 5 December 2020. Ali won via comfortable point decision after winning every round of the bout.

Professional boxing record

References

External links

 
 
 
 

1996 births
Living people
Boxers at the 2014 Summer Youth Olympics
Boxers at the 2016 Summer Olympics
British male boxers
British sportspeople in doping cases
British sportspeople of Pakistani descent
Doping cases in boxing
English people of Pakistani descent
Olympic boxers of Great Britain
People with type 1 diabetes
Sportspeople from Bury, Greater Manchester
European Games competitors for Great Britain
Boxers at the 2015 European Games
Flyweight boxers